List of big landowners in Norway includes persons as well as private and public companies owning at least  of land in Norway. The Government of Norway is, directly and indirectly, by far the largest landowner in the Kingdom. State-owned land is managed by Statskog, while a large portion was spun off to the Finnmark Estate. In Svalbard, the land is owned directly by the Minister of Trade and Industry as well as by several mining companies. The largest private owner on the mainland is Meraker Brug, which is owned by the Astrup family. Several larger landowners are commons and municipalities.

List
The following is a list of all owners of minimum  of land in Norway. It lists the name of the owner, the location in which the owning institution is registered, the area of land, the ultimate owner of the land, and the owner's sector.

See also 
 List of Norwegian estates

Notes and references 
Notes

References

Bibliography

 
Landowners
Landowners